Boyarskaya is a rural locality (a village) in Sibirskoye Rural Settlement, Verkhovazhsky District, Vologda Oblast, Russia. The population was 91 as of 2002.

Geography 
Boyarskaya is located 50 km southeast of Verkhovazhye (the district's administrative centre) by road. Yeliseyevskaya is the nearest rural locality.

References 

Rural localities in Verkhovazhsky District